Dongsi Station is an interchange station on Line 5 and Line 6 of the Beijing Subway at Dongsi Subdistrict.

Around the station
 Dongsi Mosque

Station Layout 
Both the line 5 and 6 stations have underground island platforms.

Exits 
There are 5 exits, lettered B, C, D, E, and G. Exit C is accessible.

Gallery

External links
 

Beijing Subway stations in Dongcheng District
Railway stations in China opened in 2007